Bagh Khatun (also Romanized as Bāgh Khātūn, Bāgh-e Khātūn, and Bagh Khatoon) is a village in Pishkuh Rural District, in the Central District of Taft County, Yazd Province, Iran. At the 2006 census, its population was 00, in 00 families.

References 

Populated places in Taft County